Horaninovia is a genus of flowering plants belonging to the family Amaranthaceae. It also belongs to the tribe Salsoleae as well as in the subfamily Salsoloideae.

Its native range is from Iran to Xinjiang (in China). It is found in Afghanistan, Iran, Kazakhstan, Tadzhikistan, Turkmenistan, Uzbekistan and Xinjiang.

The genus name of Horaninovia is in honour of Pavel Gorianinov (1796–1866), a Russian botanist with an interest on fungus and ferns and was a professor at the medical academy in Saint Petersburg, and it was first described and published in Enum. Pl. Nov. Vol.1 on page 10 in 1841.

Known species:

Horaninovia ulicina is the type species.

References

Amaranthaceae
Amaranthaceae genera
Plants described in 1841
Flora of Central Asia
Flora of Iran
Flora of Afghanistan
Flora of Xinjiang